And So It Goes is a 2014 American comedy-drama film directed by Rob Reiner and written by Mark Andrus. The film, which stars Michael Douglas, Diane Keaton and Sterling Jerins, was released on July 25, 2014. It received mostly negative reviews from critics, and performed modestly at the box office. The film was the second collaboration between Reiner and Douglas, and the first was  The American President (1995).

Plot 
Oren Little (Douglas), a realtor by trade, develops self-absorption, turning his back on his neighbors and shunning the notion of kindness to others. After his wife dies, part of his self-absorption is having no patience for children, not even his own now-adult estranged son. His next-door neighbor, Leah (Keaton), whose own husband has likewise died, never had any children of her own, which leads her to throw her soul and her tears into reviving a singing career that had stagnated.

One day, Oren's estranged son Luke suddenly leaves his father in charge of his own ten-year-old daughter Sarah (Sterling Jerins), a granddaughter whom Oren never knew existed. When Luke drops Sarah off at his home, needing his father to take care of her, neither Oren nor Leah, each of whom are lonely souls, have any reason to suspect that Sarah's involvement with their lives will enable them to heal their emotional wounds.

Cast 
 Michael Douglas as Oren Little
 Diane Keaton as Leah
 Sterling Jerins as Sarah Little
 Annie Parisse as Kate
 Rob Reiner as Artie
 Albert Jones as Reggie
 Yaya DaCosta as Kennedy
 Paloma Guzmán as Selena
 Scott Shepherd as Luke Little
 Frances Sternhagen as Claire
 Andy Karl as Ted Westburg
 Frankie Valli as Club Owner
 David Aaron Baker as David Shaw
 Theo Stockman as Russell
 Meryl Williams as Rita

Production 
Filming began in June 2013 in Connecticut] Shooting also took place in California and Greater Manchester.

Music 
On December 17, 2013, it was announced that Marc Shaiman had composed the music for the film.

Release 
The first trailer for the film was released on May 9, 2014.

Released on July 25, 2014, the film earned $4,642,329 in its opening weekend. Over its 10-week run, And So It Goes earned a gross in the U.S. of $15,160,801 and gross in other markets of $10,151,586 for a total box-office of $25,312,387, against a production budget of $18 million, not including marketing costs.

Reception 
And So It Goes received negative reviews from critics. On Rotten Tomatoes, it has an approval rating of 18%  based on 90 reviews with the consensus: "And So It Goes aims for comedy, but with two talented actors stuck in a half-hearted effort from a once-mighty filmmaker, it ends in unintentional tragedy". On Metacritic, it has a weighted average score of 38 out 100 based on 31 reviews, indicating "generally unfavorable reviews". Audiences surveyed by CinemaScore gave the film a grade B+ on scale of A to F.

Film critic Leonard Maltin gave the film a positive review, saying the film "offers juicy leading roles to stars Michael Douglas and Diane Keaton." Christy Lemire of Roger Ebert.com also commended the caliber of Douglas' and Keaton's performances, but gave the film 1.5 stars for its storyline, saying: "Nothing here is a spoiler. The outcome is evident from the poster alone". A review in The Washington Post review credits "the film's most alive moments" to Keaton, who channels her Annie Hall character in both her wardrobe and her singing jazz ballads in a local pub. While a review in The Guardian is happy to see "retirement-age characters" being featured in a film, it criticizes the "banal" plot, saying: "the story structure is so fake and so plodding". Film critic Richard Corliss also gave the film a negative review, saying: "And So It Goes may touch the frayed heartstrings of some older viewers, but it's pretty bad — the failed attempt to Heimlich a venerable movie genre."

References

External links 
 
 
 

2014 films
Films directed by Rob Reiner
2014 romantic comedy-drama films
American romantic comedy-drama films
Films shot in California
Films shot in Connecticut
Films shot in Greater Manchester
Films shot in England
Castle Rock Entertainment films
Films scored by Marc Shaiman
Films about old age
2014 comedy films
2014 drama films
2010s English-language films
2010s American films